Substation can refer to:

Electrical substation
 Traction substation
Police substation, a mini police station with limited services
The Substation, a Singaporean contemporary arts centre
SubStation Alpha, a subtitle file format